Norfolk and good is a humorous Norfolk phrase, which when spoken aloud takes on a whole new meaning - namely 'no fucking good'. The term has become synonymous with Sid Kipper and The Kipper Family who wrote a song entitled: 'Norfolk and Good'.

Here is an example of one of the verses:

"Now our Norfolk turkeys are simply the best, 
They sure knock the stuffing out of the rest 
/And if you tried one I'm sure that you would 
/Agree that our turkeys are Norfolk and good."

This term also taps into a self-deprecating Norfolk humour - associated with the use of the Norfolk dialect.

See also
Normal for Norfolk

External links
 Sid Kipper's website

Culture in Norfolk